Keiron Bigby (born February 27, 1966) is a former American football wide receiver in the National Football League for the Washington Redskins.  He played college football at Brown University.

1966 births
Living people
American football wide receivers
Brown Bears football players
Washington Redskins players
Sportspeople from Brooklyn
Players of American football from New York City